Sarjeh Kor (also Romanized as Sārjeh Kor; also known as Sārjeh Kūr and Sarjeh Kūr) is a village in Fajr Rural District, in the Central District of Gonbad-e Qabus County, Golestan Province, Iran. At the 2006 census, its population was 2,748, in 573 families.

References 

Populated places in Gonbad-e Kavus County